Kankanaey (also spelled Kankana-ey) is a South-Central Cordilleran language under the Austronesian family spoken on the island of Luzon in the Philippines primarily by the Kankanaey people. Alternate names for the language include Central Kankanaey, Kankanai, and Kankanay. It is widely used by Cordillerans, alongside Ilocano, specifically people from Mountain Province and people from the northern part of the Benguet Province. Kankanaey has a slight mutual intelligibility with the Ilocano language.

Dialects
Ethnologue lists Mankayan-Buguias, Kapangan, Bakun-Kibungan, and Guinzadan as dialects of Kankanaey. Northern Kankanaey is listed as a separate language.

Kankanaey is spoken in northern Benguet, southwestern Mountain Province, southeastern Ilocos Sur, northeastern La Union, and southwestern Ifugao. Northern Kankanaey is spoken in western Mountain Province, southeastern Ilocos Sur, and southern Abra.

Phonology

Consonants 

 Stops can be heard as unreleased, when in syllable-final position.

Vowels 

 Allophones of /i, a/ are heard as [ɪ, ʌ].
 Allophones of /o/ can be heard as [ʊ], [u].

This language should not be confused with a related, but different, language in the Sagada area called Kankanay. Of particular phonological interest is the very common occurrence of what is called the "barred i" in IPA. It is the unrounded, high mid vowel on the IPA chart. The letter /e/ in Kankanaey is to be pronounced as this sound, and not as the e in words like bet or wet.  This is also one of the vowels in a few other Northern Luzon languages like Iloko and Pangasinan. The [e] sound is found in loanwords from other Philippine languages, mostly Ilocano and some Tagalog, including Spanish loanwords from those languages.

Some words with this sound are as follows:

  – 'to go'
  – 'let's go' (a contracted form of )
  – a preposition showing location or time marker (e.g.  'in Baguio',  'in the long-ago times')
  – 'to put'
  – 'only, finish'

Grammar

Kankanaey content roots 
Kankanaey content roots divide the Kankanaey lexicon into different categories to define their usage and word type. The categories are class roots, property roots, stative roots, perception-stative roots, physical roots, and action roots. Word charts and definitions taken from Allen, Janet's Kankanaey: A Role and Reference Grammar Analysis.

Class roots 
Class roots are a class of nouns that are defined by physical or other sensory characteristics.

Example of class roots:

Property roots 
Property roots point out a characteristic like size, taste, color, etc.

Example of property roots:

Stative roots 
Stative roots point out a temporary physical condition. Result-stative roots are states that are changed by an outside source.

Example of stative roots:

Perception-stative roots 
Perception-stative roots point out a perception by a living being, such as physical, emotional and mental perception-states. Living beings are able to actively perceive with control and content, so these roots form predicates of a wider range than those formed from simple stative roots.

Example of perception-stative roots:

Physical roots 
Physical roots point out movements and position such as natural movements, body movements, and positions, but not bodily functions. They may denote location, direction, or manner of movement.

Example of physical roots:

Action roots 
Action roots point out an activity by a living and sometimes intentional participant. Some action roots indicate the direction of that action with respect to another participant; others denote a participant as involved with the action but not the end receiver. Rather than having the action root modified, Kankanaey roots are very specific as to what the action is. Many roots indicate the receiver of the action.

Example of action roots:

Reduplication 
Multiple types of reduplication are used when forming words in Kankanaey. Unaffixed or affixed roots may experience reduplication, and have their first CV, CVC, or CV(C)CV of the base form copied, with each type of base executing different functions. Kankanaey has many roots that have canonical shapes that appear to possess reduplication. All of these irreducible roots are not examples of reduplication as a word-building process.

Prefixes 
This is because the glottal metathesizes with the second consonant under phonological constraints.

Suffixes 
According to Allen, Janet's Kankanaey: A Role and Reference Grammar Analysis, only "two predicating affixes are suffixes, -en and -an.

Infixes 

, 'was repeatedly hitting/slapping', is formed by first reduplicating the word , 'hit with slapping sound', into , and then the predicating infixation and aspect infixation are added. This is because reduplication usually precedes both the predicating infixation and aspect infixation. However, in this example, vowel reduction occurred when the infixes were added before the vowel, causing the infixes -in- and -om- to become -inm-.

Circumfixes 
A lot of affixes consist of a prefix or an infix, which is also followed by a suffix. These are called circumfixes and have their own unique meanings, not a combination of the two parts.

Examples taken from Allen, Janet's Kankanaey: A Role and Reference Grammar Analysis.

Predicate formation 
The Kankanaey vocabulary is arranged by root morphemes, and points out the important semantic properties of each root. Kankanaey roots deeply rely on the combination with their affixes to determine their meaning in phrases and clauses. The predicates that form are determined by the interaction of the affixation to the semantic properties of the root that are relevant in its context. Aktionsart is a way to categorize event semantics, proposed by Vendler (1967), by if they are "happening" or are static, and it distinguishes them by their temporal properties and its dynamicity. According to Allen, Janet's Kankanaey: A Role and Reference Grammar Analysis, "VVLP (1997) and Van Valin (2005) expanded the list of categories to reflect resultant situations, adding semelfactives and complex predicates–active accomplishments and causatives."

Gallery

References

South–Central Cordilleran languages
Languages of Benguet
Languages of Mountain Province